Berdykhiv is a village (selo) in the Lviv Oblast (province), Yavoriv Raion of Western Ukraine. It belongs to Novoiavorivsk urban hromada, one of the hromadas of Ukraine.
Area of the village totals is 1,023 km2. Local government is administered by Berdykhivska village council.

Geography 

History and religion 
The first written record of the village dates from 1598. But in these areas archaeologists found traces of a settlement an earlier epochs.
Residents of the village took part in the National War led by Bohdan Khmelnytsky.
In 1786 there was a poor harvest throughout Galicia and the winter brought a great famine. In 1788 there were 10 occupied houses in Berdykhiv. In 1812 there were only 7 occupied houses in the village and the total population was 48. By 1820 there were 10 occupied houses again.
The German colonies/settlement of Berdikau and Mossberg were founded in 1783 in the village Berdykhiv (district of Jaworow in Galicia). 
Now the population of the village is about 680 people. Church of St. Nicolas is in the village.

References

External links 
 The historical significance of the national liberation struggle.
 weather.in.ua/Berdykhiv
 Церква Святого Миколая (Бердихів)

Literature 
 Історія міст і сіл УРСР : Львівська область, Яворівський район, Бердихів. – К. : ГРУРЕ, 1968 р. Page 925 
Villages in Yavoriv Raion